Several naval ships of Germany were named Karlsruhe after the city of Karlsruhe, Germany:

 , World War I German light cruiser, launched 1912
 ,  light cruiser, launched 1916
 ,  7,200 ton  light cruiser, sunk World War II 
 ,  (Type 122) frigate, launched 1982, decommissioned 2017

German Navy ship names